Alireza Mashaghi is a biophysicist and medical scientist at Leiden University. He is known for his contributions to single-molecule analysis of chaperone assisted protein folding, molecular topology and medical systems biophysics and bioengineering.

Mashaghi made the first observation of direct chaperone involvement during folding of a protein, using a single molecule force spectroscopy method. This work which has been published in Nature solved a long-standing puzzle in biology. In 2017, he reported a new model for chaperone DnaK function and made a discovery that, according to Ans Hekkenberg, "overturns the decades-old textbook model of action for a protein that is central for many processes in living cells". He and his co-workers found that chaperone DnaK can recognise natively folded protein parts and thereby promotes protein folding directly. Inspired by single-molecule analysis of biopolymers, Mashaghi and his team developed a topology framework, termed as circuit topology, which enabled studying folded molecular chains, beyond what knot theory can offer. Both knot theory and circuit topology aim to describe chain entanglement. Knot theory considers any entangled chain as a connected sum of prime knots, which are themselves undecomposable. Circuit topology splits any entangled chains (including prime knots) into basic structural units called soft contacts, and lists simple rules how soft contacts can be put together. An advantage of circuit topology is that it can be applied to open linear chains with intra-chain interactions, so called hard contacts. This enabled topological analysis of proteins and genomes, which are often described as "unknot" in knot theory.  

Mashaghi also contributed to others areas in biophysics and bioengineering including membrane biophysics, membrane based lab-on-a-chip biosensing, and organ-on-a-chip technology. In particular, the Mashaghi team was one of the first to introduce Organ Chip technology to the field of virology. His team engineered the first chip-based disease model for Ebola hemorrhagic shock syndrome, and later extended the applicability of the platform to various viral haemorrhagic syndromes. Ebola and similar viruses pathologically alter the mechanics of human cells, which is recapitulated in organ chip models. Moreover, the Mashaghi team developed optical tweezers and acoustic force spectroscopy based assays to probe such mechanical alterations at the single cell level.  

Mashaghi is also active in interdisciplinary research in ophthalmology and clinical medicine. His main contributions were in the areas of ocular inflammation and immunomodulation. In 2017, he and his co-workers at Harvard developed an immunotherapy strategy to improve survival of high-risk cornea grafts. Together with his co-workers, he contributed to the use of stem cell technology, omics technology, and computational systems biophysics approaches in studying ocular surface diseases. Furthermore, in their research, Mashaghi and his co-workers are linking statistical physics and medical diagnostics; this unprecedented link between physics and medicine may allow for early and efficient diagnosis of certain diseases. 

During his academic career, Mashaghi has been affiliated with various institutions including Harvard University, Leiden University, Massachusetts Institute of Technology, Delft University of Technology, ETH Zurich, Max Planck Institutes, and AMOLF. Mashaghi has published more than 100 papers in peer-reviewed scientific journals including several papers in Nature and Nature specialty journals. He worked and co-authored with Cees Dekker, Anthony A. Hyman, Colin Adams, Donald E. Ingber, Huib Bakker, Reza Dana, and Petra Schwille. He serves on editorial board of several journals including Nano Research and Scientific Reports.

In 2018, Mashaghi has been named as "Discoverer of the Year" by Leiden University. He is the recipient of several awards including an honorarium from American Chemical Society.

References 

Year of birth missing (living people)
Living people
Physician-scientists
Biophysicists
Dutch ophthalmologists
Harvard University staff
Academic staff of Leiden University
ETH Zurich alumni